Pete Budd (born 18 July 1940) is a British singer who has fronted the Scrumpy and Western band The Wurzels since 1974. He was the vocalist on the number-one hit "The Combine Harvester" and number three hit "I Am a Cider Drinker" in 1976.

Life and career
Peter Budd was born in the Bristol suburb of Brislington. In the 1950s he fronted the band Pete Budd and the Rebels before moving to the Rainbow People the following decade. During the early 1970s he was part of 'The Eddie King Band''.

Budd originally joined the Wurzels as a guitarist and banjo player in 1972. He became the band's singer and frontman following the death of original lead vocalist Adge Cutler in 1974.

In 2015, he and the rest of the Wurzels made a music video to encourage safety of farm workers following a spate of fatal accidents.

Budd is a carer for his wife, who has Alzheimer's disease.

References

1940 births
Living people
English country singers
English male guitarists
English male singers
English multi-instrumentalists
English rhythm and blues musicians
English rhythm and blues singers
English rock guitarists
English rock singers
Musicians from Bristol
20th-century British male singers
21st-century British male singers